Tomle is a top of Cadair Berwyn in north east Wales. It is the highest of the summits found on the most easterly of Cadair Berwyn's long south ridges.

Tomle's summit is boggy and unmarked. To the north, the ridge continues up to Cadair Berwyn North Top. The Craig Berwyn face starting on the west side of the ridge. To the south lies Foel Wen, Foel Wen South Top and Mynydd Tarw.

References

External links
 www.geograph.co.uk : photos of Cadair Berwyn and surrounding area

Hewitts of Wales
Mountains and hills of Denbighshire
Mountains and hills of Powys
Nuttalls